Raymond Parker (24 October 1919 – 19 January 2009) was a British sprint canoeist who competed in the early 1950s. He finished 15th in the K-2 10000 m event at the 1952 Summer Olympics in Helsinki.

References
Raymond Parker's profile at Sports Reference.com

1919 births
2009 deaths
Canoeists at the 1952 Summer Olympics
Olympic canoeists of Great Britain
British male canoeists